Ahmad Mostafa Hijazi (born 22 August 1994) is a Lebanese footballer who plays as a forward for  club Ansar.

Club career 
After spending three seasons on loan from Ahed—at Racing Beirut, Nabi Chit, and Akhaa Ahli Aley, respectively—Hijazi signed a permanent deal with Akhaa Ahli Aley in summer 2019. He was sent on loan to Ansar on 23 January 2020, to compete in the 2020 AFC Cup.

On 9 July 2020, Hijazi joined Ansar permanently on a five-year deal. On 24 April 2021, he helped his team win the 2020–21 Lebanese Premier League, their first league title since 2007—and 14th overall—scoring in a 2–1 win against rivals Nejmeh in the Beirut derby in the last matchday of the season. Hijazi also helped Ansar win the double, beating Nejmeh in the 2020–21 Lebanese FA Cup final on penalty shoot-outs.

International career 
Hijazi made his international debut for Lebanon on 5 August 2019, in a 0–0 draw against Palestine at the 2019 WAFF Championship.

Career statistics

International

Honours 
Ansar
 Lebanese Premier League: 2020–21
 Lebanese FA Cup: 2020–21; runner-up: 2021–22
 Lebanese Super Cup: 2021
 Lebanese Elite Cup runner-up: 2022

References

External links

 
 
 
 
 

1994 births
Living people
Lebanese footballers
Lebanon international footballers
Association football forwards
Lebanese Premier League players
Racing Club Beirut players
Al Nabi Chit SC players
Akhaa Ahli Aley FC players
Al Ahed FC players
Al Ansar FC players
People from Sidon